Kardo Ploomipuu (born 24 March 1988 in Pärnu) is an Estonian swimmer.

His first Paralympics was the 2004 Athens Games. He is the current IPC European record holder in 50 and 100 m backstroke (long course; S10).

Achievements

References

External links
 

1988 births
Living people
Sportspeople from Pärnu
Paralympic bronze medalists for Estonia
Paralympic swimmers of Estonia
Paralympic medalists in swimming
Swimmers at the 2004 Summer Paralympics
Swimmers at the 2008 Summer Paralympics
Medalists at the 2008 Summer Paralympics
S10-classified Paralympic swimmers
Medalists at the World Para Swimming Championships
Medalists at the World Para Swimming European Championships
Estonian male backstroke swimmers
21st-century Estonian people